Events from the year 1903 in the United States.

Incumbents

Federal Government 
 President: Theodore Roosevelt (R-New York)
 Vice President: vacant
 Chief Justice: Melville Fuller  (Illinois)
 Speaker of the House of Representatives: David B. Henderson (R-Iowa) (until March 4), Joseph Gurney Cannon (R-Illinois) (starting November 9)
 Congress: 57th (until March 4), 58th (starting March 4)

Events

January–March
 January 19 – The first west-east transatlantic radio broadcast is made from the United States to England (the first east-west broadcast having been made in December 1901).
 January 21 – Section of Militia Affairs within the Adjutant General's office.
 February 11 – The Oxnard Strike of 1903 becomes the first time in U.S. history that a labor union is formed from members of different races.
 February 14 
Census Board within the Department of Commerce and Labor (Census Bureau).
Department of Commerce and Labor founded
U.S. Coast and Geodetic Survey transferred to the Department of Commerce and Labor.
 February 15 – Morris and Rose Mitchom introduce the first teddy bear in America.
 February 23 – Cuba leases Guantanamo Bay to the United States "in perpetuity".
 March 2 – In New York City, the Martha Washington Hotel, the first hotel exclusively for women, opens.
 March 14 – The Hay–Herrán Treaty, granting the United States the right to build the Panama Canal, is ratified by the United States Senate. The Colombian Senate later rejects the treaty.
 March 30 – Queensboro Bridge opens.

April–June
 May 16 – 8:05pm: Luna Park, Coney Island, New York, opens.
 June 12 – The Sigma Alpha Iota International Music Fraternity is founded at the University of Michigan School of Music.
 June 14 – Heppner Flood of 1903: The town of Heppner, Oregon, is nearly destroyed by a cloudburst that results in a flash flood.

July–September
 July 1 – U.S. Bureau of Fisheries within Department of Commerce & Labor.
 July 6–10 – Evansville race riot in Evansville, Indiana.
 July 7 – "Mother" Mary Harris Jones starts a "Children's Crusade" ("March of the Mill Children") from Kensington, Philadelphia to Oyster Bay, New York, the hometown of President Roosevelt, with banners demanding "We want to go to school and not the mines!" 
 July 23 – Dr. Ernst Pfenning of Chicago becomes the first owner of a Ford Model A.
 August 9 – Commanding General post replaced by that of Chief of Staff of the Army.
 September–October – A mysterious "visitor" is reported in Van Meter, Iowa.
 September 3 – Los Angeles real estate investor Griffith J. Griffith shoots his wife in the face at the Arcadia Hotel in Santa Monica.
 September 11 – The first stock car event is held at the Milwaukee Mile.
 September 15 – Miami Herald first published as The Miami Evening Record.
 September 27 – The Wreck of the Old 97 engine at Stillhouse Trestle near Danville, Virginia, which kills nine people, inspiring a ballad and song.

October–December

 October – Frank Nelson Cole proves that 267-1 is composite by factoring it as 193,707,721 * 761,838,257,287 after trying for every Sunday over three years.
 October 1 – The first modern World Series pits the National League's Pittsburgh against Boston of the American League.
 November 2
 Maggie L. Walker becomes the first African American woman to charter a bank.
 Lyceum Theatre (Broadway) opens, making it the oldest continuously operating legitimate theater in New York City.
 November 4 – With the encouragement of the United States, Panama proclaims itself independent from Colombia.
 November 13 – The United States recognizes the independence of Panama.
 November 18 – The Hay–Bunau-Varilla Treaty is signed by the United States and Panama, giving the U.S. exclusive rights over the Panama Canal Zone.
 November 23 – Colorado Governor James Hamilton Peabody sends the state militia into the town of Cripple Creek to break up a miners' strike.
 December 17 – Orville Wright flies an aircraft with a petrol engine at Kitty Hawk, North Carolina, in the first documented, successful, controlled, powered, heavier-than-air flight.
 December 19 – Williamsburg Bridge opens.
 December 30 – A fire at the Iroquois Theater in Chicago kills 600.

Undated
 The Lincoln–Lee Legion is established to promote the temperance movement and signing of alcohol abstinence pledges by children.
 The first box of Crayola crayons is made and sold for 5 cents. It contains 8 colors; brown, red, orange, yellow, green, blue, violet and black.
 Coca-Cola removes cocaine as a key ingredient from their formula; up to this time, it has contained approximately nine milligrams of cocaine per glass.

Ongoing
 Progressive Era (1890s–1920s)
 Lochner era (c. 1897–c. 1937)

Births
 January 1 – Dwight Taylor, screenwriter and author (died 1986)
 January 27 – Otto P. Weyland, general (died 1979)
 March 7 – J. Allen Frear, Jr., United States Senator from Delaware from 1949 till 1961. (died 1993)
 April 19 – Eliot Ness, American Prohibition agent (died 1957)
 May 3 – Bing Crosby, early crooner, singer of the hit, "White Christmas". (died 1977)
 June 22 – John Dillinger, gangster in the Depression-era United States (died 1934)
 August 7 – Joseph H. Bottum, United States Senator from South Dakota from 1962 till 1963. (died 1984)
 October 6 – Brien McMahon, United States Senator from Connecticut from 1945 till 1952. (died 1952)

Deaths
 January 4
Gulstan Ropert, missionary (born 1839)
Topsy, elephant (born 1875)
 January 28 – John B. Allen, U.S. Senator from Washington from 1889 to 1893 (born 1845)
 February 11 – Rachel Crane Mather, educator (born 1823)
 February 26 – Richard Jordan Gatling, inventor (born 1818)
 March 11 – Lou Graham, wealthy business woman and madame from Germany (born 1857 in Germany)
 March 16 – Roy Bean, justice of the peace (born 1825)
 March 20 – Charles Godfrey Leland, humorist, folklorist and poet (born 1824)
 March 29 – Gustavus Franklin Swift, businessman (born 1839)
 April 22 – Alexander Ramsey, 2nd Governor of Minnesota from 1860 to 1863 and U.S. Senator from Minnesota from 1863 to 1875 (born 1815)
 April 28 – Josiah Willard Gibbs, physical chemist (born 1839)
 April 29 – Stuart Robson, stage actor and comedian  (born 1836)
 May 29 – Bruce Price, architect (born 1845)
 July 2 – Ed Delahanty, baseball player (born 1867)
 July 3 – Harriet Lane, acting First Lady of the United States during James Buchanan's presidency (born 1830)
 July 27 – Frederick J. Kimball, civil engineer (born 1844)
 August 1 – Calamity Jane, frontierswoman (born 1852)
 August 28 – Frederick Law Olmsted, landscape architect, journalist, social critic and public administrator (born 1822)
 September 23 – Charles B. Farwell, U.S. Senator from Illinois from 1887 to 1891 (born 1823)
 September 28 – Edward Merritt Hughes, naval officer (b. 1850)
 October 6 – Wilson S. Bissell, politician, United States Postmaster General (born 1847)
 October 20 – Thomas Vincent Welch, politician (born 1850)
 November 3 – Eliza Hendricks, Second Lady of the United States as wife of Thomas A. Hendricks (born 1823)
 November 20 – Tom Horn, gunfighter and outlaw (born 1860)
 December 13 – Alexander McDonald, U.S. Senator from Arkansas from 1868 to 1871 (born 1832)
 December 23 – Middleton P. Barrow, U.S. Senator from Georgia from 1882 to 1883 (born 1839)

See also
 List of American films of 1903
 Timeline of United States history (1900–1929)

References

Further reading
 . (Covers events May 1898 – June 1905)

External links
 

 
1900s in the United States
United States
United States
Years of the 20th century in the United States